Jametz is a small commune in the Meuse department in Grand Est in north-eastern France, near the Belgian border.

Economy 
Since the 15th century, residents have primarily worked as cattle farmers, cheesemakers, carpenters and leatherworkers. To raise the profile of the locale's products and traditions, many inhabitants have used the placename as a surname (including variations like Jamet and Jamett).

See also
Communes of the Meuse department

References

Communes of Meuse (department)